Franc Rode  (or Rodé; born 23/09/1934) is a Slovenian cardinal of the Roman Catholic Church. He is the prefect emeritus of the Congregation for Institutes of Consecrated Life and Societies of Apostolic Life, having served as prefect from 2004 to 2011. He was elevated to the cardinalate in 2006.

He was raised to the rank of Cardinal-Priest on 20 June 2016 by Pope Francis while retaining his titular church.

Biography

Early life and religious profession
Franc Rode was born in Rodica near Ljubljana, in Yugoslavia (modern-day Slovenia). In 1945 he and his family sought refuge in Austria and later fled to Argentina in 1948. He entered the Congregation of the Mission, more commonly known as the Vincentians or Lazarists, in Buenos Aires in 1952, making his perpetual profession in 1957. Rode studied at the Pontifical Gregorian University in Rome, and at the Catholic Institute of Paris, from where he obtained his doctorate in theology in 1968. Rode is fluent in Slovene, Spanish, Italian, French, and German.

Pastoral work
Rode was ordained to the priesthood by Bishop André-Jean-François Defebvre CM, on 29 June 1960 in Paris. In 1965, at the request of his superiors, Rode returned to Yugoslavia, where he worked as vice-pastor, director of studies and provincial visitor of the Lazarists, and professor of fundamental theology and Missiology at the Theological Faculty of Ljubljana.

Curial work
In 1978 Rode was made consultor of the Secretariat for Non-Believers in the Roman Curia, being transferred to that dicastery in 1981 and rising to become its Undersecretary in 1982. During this time, he assisted in the organization of some significant dialogue sessions with European Marxists. When Pope John Paul II united the Pontifical Council for Culture and Pontifical Council for Non-Believers in 1993, he appointed Rode Secretary of the new Pontifical Council for Culture. As Secretary, he served as the second-highest official of that dicastery, under Paul Poupard.

Archbishop
On 5 March 1997, Pope John Paul appointed Rode Archbishop of Ljubljana. He received his episcopal consecration on the following 6 April from Archbishop Alojzij Šuštar, with Archbishop Franc Perko and Cardinal Aloysius Ambrozic, Archbishop of Toronto, a fellow ethnic Slovene bishop from the diaspora serving as co-consecrators, in the Cathedral of Ljubljana. Rode successfully guided the negotiations for a new concordat to final approval in 2004.

Cardinal
Rode was created a Cardinal Deacon by Pope Benedict XVI on 24 March 2006.
His motto is a phrase in Old Slovene, "Stati inu obstati" (To Exist and Persevere / To Stand and Withstand), taken from the Catechism of Primož Trubar, which is also inscribed on the Slovenian 1 euro coin. In 2013 he was the first Slovenian in history to participate in a papal conclave.

Congregation for Institutes of Consecrated Life
Rode returned to the Roman Curia upon his nomination as prefect of the Congregation for Institutes of Consecrated Life and Societies of Apostolic Life on 11 February 2004. Pope Benedict XVI later created Rode Cardinal-Deacon of S. Francesco Saverio alla Garbatella in the consistory of 24 March 2006. In January 2011, he retired as the prefect of the Congregation.

Until his 80th birthday Rode was a member of the various offices in the Roman Curia: congregations of Divine Worship and the Discipline of the Sacraments; for Bishops; for the Evangelization of Peoples; for Catholic Education; Pontifical Council for Culture and the Pontifical Commission Ecclesia Dei.

He was one of the cardinal electors who participated in the 2013 papal conclave that elected Pope Francis.

Allegations of fatherhood
In August 2012 Slovenian media reported allegations that Rode had fathered a child. Rode denied the allegations and expressed willingness to submit to a DNA test. He also announced lawsuits against the media for alleged breaches of his right to privacy. "After all they've done to me they deserve this," he said. The DNA test proved negative.

References

External links
 
Franc Rode

1934 births
Living people
People from the Municipality of Domžale
Slovenian emigrants to Argentina
Vincentians
Pontifical Gregorian University alumni
Institut Catholique de Paris alumni
Roman Catholic archbishops of Ljubljana
Slovenian cardinals
20th-century Roman Catholic archbishops in Slovenia
21st-century Roman Catholic archbishops in Slovenia
Vincentian bishops
Members of the Congregation for Divine Worship and the Discipline of the Sacraments
Members of the Congregation for the Evangelization of Peoples
Members of the Congregation for Institutes of Consecrated Life and Societies of Apostolic Life
Members of the Pontifical Council for Culture
Vincentian cardinals
Cardinals created by Pope Benedict XVI
Members of the Congregation for Bishops
Members of the Congregation for Catholic Education
Members of the European Academy of Sciences and Arts